USS Exultant (AMc-79) was an Accentor-class minesweeper acquired by the U.S. Navy.

World War II service 

Exultant was launched on 27 September 1941 by W. A. Robinson Inc., Ipswich, Massachusetts; sponsored by Mrs. A. T. Leavitt Jr.; and placed in service on 14 January 1942 for minesweeping in the 6th Naval District out of Charleston, South Carolina.

Reclassified YDT-4 

On 15 February 1943 she was reclassified YDT-4, and assigned to the 1st Naval District as a diving tender. She continued to perform this duty through 1962.

As the unnamed YDT-4, she was disposed of as a target 1 July 1973.

References

External links 
 NavSource Online: Mine Warfare Vessel Photo Archive - Exultant (AMc 79) - YDT-4

Accentor-class minesweepers
World War II mine warfare vessels of the United States
Ships built in Ipswich, Massachusetts
1941 ships